Carmine Appice (born December 15, 1946) is an American rock drummer. He is best known for his associations with Vanilla Fudge; Cactus; the power trio Beck, Bogert & Appice; Rod Stewart; King Kobra; and Blue Murder. He is also Vinny Appice's older brother. Appice was inducted into the Classic Drummer Hall of Fame in 2013 and the Modern Drummer Hall of Fame in 2014.

He is credited with influencing later rock drummers including Iron Maiden's Nicko McBrain, Aerosmith's Joey Kramer, Roger Taylor of Queen, Phil Collins of Genesis, Rush's Neil Peart, Mötley Crüe's Tommy Lee, Slayer's Dave Lombardo, Richard Christy, David Kinkade, Ray Mehlbaum, Led Zeppelin's John Bonham, Ian Paice of Deep Purple, Anvil's Robb Reiner and Eric Singer of Kiss.

His best-selling drum instruction book The Realistic Rock Drum Method. was first published in 1972 and has since been revised and republished as The Ultimate Realistic Rock Drum Method. It covers the basic subjects of rock rhythms and polyrhythms, linear rudiments and groupings, shuffle rhythms, hi-hat and double bass drum exercises.

Career

Appice received classical music training, and was influenced early on by the work of jazz drummers Buddy Rich and Gene Krupa. Appice first came to prominence as the drummer with the late 1960s psychedelic band Vanilla Fudge. He contributed distinctive background harmonies with bassist Tim Bogert. After five albums, the pair left Vanilla Fudge to form the blues rock quartet Cactus, with vocalist Rusty Day and guitarist Jim McCarty. Appice and Bogert then left Cactus to join Jeff Beck in the power trio Beck, Bogert & Appice. Appice joined Rod Stewart's backing band in 1976   co-writing songs such as "Da Ya Think I'm Sexy?" and "Young Turks". He also played drums on a track on Paul Stanley's eponymous solo album (1978).

He was a member of KGB, which featured Ray Kennedy, Ric Grech, Mike Bloomfield and Barry Goldberg. Appice has recorded with artists such as Stanley Clarke, Ted Nugent and Pink Floyd. He has also played with King Kobra and (alongside John Sykes) in Blue Murder. On May 23, 1981, Tom Bradley, the then Mayor of Los Angeles, proclaimed that day as Carmine Appice Day in the city, in recognition of the drummer's charitable and educational work. In late 1983 Appice toured with Ozzy Osbourne in support of his Gold-selling Bark at the Moon album, but shortly afterward was fired from the backing group. Though Osbourne had a good relationship with him, the singer's wife and manager Sharon detested Appice, and the decision to fire him was strictly hers.

Appice recorded Caso Cerrado (1995) with the Argentine guitarist Pappo. They were also joined by bassist Tim Bogert on four songs, including "P. B. A. Boogie". He spent 1999 touring Japan with Bogert and Char in a unit called CB&A, with a live album released the following year. In 2000, Appice formed the power trio DBA with Bogert and Rick Derringer, and was reunited once again with Bogert when they reformed Vanilla Fudge.

In 2005, he became an official supporter of Little Kids Rock, a nonprofit organization which provides free musical instruments and instruction to children in less privileged public schools throughout the USA. He has personally delivered instruments to children in the program and has also performed at benefit concerts for the organization and sits on its Honorary board of directors.

In 2006, he formed the drum ensemble SLAMM in which Appice participated on drums playing alongside four young drummers; the resulting show has been described as "Stomp on steroids". The band filmed a promotional video for the Cable Network station ESPN, using a NASCAR garage as a set and mechanics' hardware as instruments. SLAMM was voted as the runner-up in the Drum magazine poll for Percussion Ensemble (2008) after a special appearance at the magazine's drum festival. The group also appears on the Modern Drummer festival DVD (2008).

He recorded Carmine Appice's Guitar Zeus: Conquering Heroes (2009). This was the third album in his Guitar Zeus series. These albums have featured guitarists such as Jennifer Batten, Brian May, Ted Nugent, Richie Sambora and Yngwie Malmsteen.

Carmine Appice lives in New York with his longtime girlfriend, radio personality Leslie Gold, The Radiochick.

He lent his talents to the Sly Stone CD I'm Back! Family & Friends, on which he plays on the Sly classic "Stand!" It was released on August 16, 2011.

2011–2012 saw Carmine performing Drum Wars shows with his brother Vinny Appice and guitarist Michael Hund, as well a reformation of King Kobra with Johnny Rod, Mick Sweda, and David Henzerling, with Paul Shortino replacing Marcie Free on lead vocals. This lineup released an eponymous album, King Kobra, in April 2011 on the Frontiers label, which received critical acclaim. A new King Kobra album was released in 2013, titled King Kobra II, featuring the song "Have a Good Time", for which a music video was filmed in the fall of 2012 at Count's Vamp'd in Las Vegas Valley.

Appice published his memoir, Stick It!: My Life of Sex, Drums & Rock 'n' Roll, in 2016.

Appice was set to play with Vinnie Vincent in a mini-reunion show slated originally for December 2018 but moved to February 2019 before ultimately being completely canceled.

In 2021, Appice released "Energy Overload". The album is credited to Appice Perdomo Project which is a collaboration with Multi Instrumentalist Fernando Perdomo.

Discography

Albums 

Appice (with his brother Vinny Appice)
 Sinister (2017)

Carmine Appice
Rockers (1981)
Carmine Appice's Guitar Zeus (1995)
Carmine Appice's Guitar Zeus 2: Channel Mind Radio (1997)
Carmine Appice's Guitar Zeus Japan (1999)
Carmine Appice's Guitar Zeus Korea (2002)
V8 (2008)
Carmine Appice's Guitar Zeus: Conquering Heroes (double CD) (2009)
Carmine Appice's Guitar Zeus 25th Anniversary (2021)

Appice Perdomo Project (with Fernando Perdomo)
 Energy Overload (2021)

Beck, Bogert & Appice
Beck, Bogert & Appice (1973)
Live in Japan (1973)

Blue Murder
Blue Murder (1989)
Nothin' But Trouble (1993)

Cactus
Cactus (1970)
One Way...Or Another (1971)
Restrictions (1971)
'Ot 'N' Sweaty (1972)
Fully Unleashed: The Live Gigs (2004)
Cactus V (2006)
Fully Unleashed: The Live Gigs Vol. II (2007)
Black Dawn (2016)
Tightrope (2021)

Char, Bogert & Appice
Live in Japan (1999)

Derringer, Bogert & Appice
Doin' Business As… (2001)

DNA
Party Tested (1983)

Jan Akkerman
Tabernakel (1974)

KGB
KGB (1976)
Motion (1976)

King Kobra
Ready to Strike (1985)
Thrill of a Lifetime (1986)
King Kobra III (1988)
Hollywood Trash (2001)
King Kobra (2011)
King Kobra II (2013)

Marty Friedman
True Obsessions (1996)

Michael Schenker
Temple of Rock (2011)

Mother's Army
Mothers Army (1993)
Planet Earth (1997)

Pappo's Blues
Caso Cerrado (1995)

Paul Stanley
Paul Stanley (1978)

Pearl
Pearl (1997)
4 Infinity (1998)

Pink Floyd
"Dogs of War" from A Momentary Lapse of Reason (1987)

Rated X
Rated X (2014)

Rod Stewart
Foot Loose & Fancy Free (1977)
Blondes Have More Fun (1978)
Foolish Behaviour (1980)
Tonight I'm Yours (1981)

Sly Stone
I'm Back! Family & Friends (credited only to "Sly Stone") (2011)

Ted Nugent
Nugent (1982)

Travers & Appice (as duo with Pat Travers)  
It Takes A Lot of Balls (2004)
Live at the House of Blues (2005)
Bazooka (2006)

Vanilla Fudge
Vanilla Fudge (1967)
The Beat Goes On (1968)
Renaissance (1968)
Near the Beginning (1969)
Rock & Roll (1969)
Mystery (1984)
The Best of Vanilla Fudge Live (1991)
2001/The Return/Then And Now (2001)
The Real Deal – Vanilla Fudge Live (2003)
Out Through the In Door (2007)
Orchestral Fudge/When Two Worlds Collide (2008)
Box of Fudge (2010)
Spirit Of '67 (2015)

Vargas, Bogert & Appice
Javier Vargas, Tim Bogert, Carmine Appice: Featuring Paul Shortino (2011)

With others 
 Hear 'n Aid - "Stars" (1986)
 Cozy Powell Tribute – Cozy Powell Forever (1998)
 Moonstone Project – Time to Take a Stand/Hidden in Time (2006)
 Who Are You – An All-Star Tribute to the Who (2012)
 The Rod Experience – Rod Stewart Tribute Band, including original RS band members (2014)
 Pat Travers - The Balls (2016)
 Chris Catena's Rock City Tribe – Truth in Unity (2020)

Awards 
Hollywood's Rockwalk
Modern Drummer: Best Rock Drummer – Editors' award (lifetime achievement)
Sabian Cymbals: Best Rock Drummer – lifetime achievement
Guitar Center: Legends' Award

References

Further reading
 
Carmine Appice DRUM! Magazine Interview
Hjort, Chris and Hinman, Doug. Jeff's book : A chronology of Jeff Beck's career 1965–1980 : from the Yardbirds to Jazz-Rock. Rock 'n' Roll Research Press, (2000). 
Realistic Rock: 35th Anniversary Special Edition. Appice, Carmine. Alfred Publishing Company (March 2007) 
The Ultimate Realistic Rock Drum Method. Appice, Carmine. Alfred Publishing Company (July 2000).
Ultimate Play-Along Drum Trax. Appice, Carmine Guitar Zeus. Alfred Publishing Company (August 2004) 
Rudiments to Rock. Alfred Publishing Company (July 1995). 
Realistic Rock for Kids. Alfred Publishing Company  (2003)

External links
Carmine Appice official website
Cactus official website
Official Slamm website
Carmine Appice Interview NAMM Oral History Library (2019)

American heavy metal drummers
American rock drummers
1946 births
Living people
Musicians from Brooklyn
King Kobra members
Blue Murder (band) members
The Ozzy Osbourne Band members
Vanilla Fudge members
Cactus (American band) members
American session musicians
Beck, Bogert & Appice members
20th-century American drummers
American male drummers
Michael Schenker Group members
Mother's Army members
21st-century American drummers